The Indian cricket team toured Sri Lanka from 21 July to 7 August 2012. The tour consisted of five One Day Internationals (ODIs) and one Twenty20 International (T20I). India landed to Sri Lanka 18 July 2012.

Squad

ODI series
 
.

1st ODI

2nd ODI

3rd ODI

4th ODI

5th ODI

T20I

Statistics

ODI

Batting

Full table at ESPNcricinfo

Bowling

Full table at ESPNcricinfo

T20s

Batting

Full Table at ESPNcricinfo

Bowling

Full Table at ESPNcricinfo

References

External links
ESPN CricInfo - India tour of Sri Lanka, 2012
 India tour of Sri Lanka, 2012/Statistics

2012 in Indian cricket
2012
International cricket competitions in 2012
2012 in Sri Lankan cricket
Sri Lankan cricket seasons from 2000–01